Joel Williams may refer to:

 Joel Williams (linebacker) (born 1956), American football player
 Joel Williams (offensive lineman) (1926–1997), American football player
 Joel Williams (tight end) (born 1965), American football player
 Joel Williams (Big Brother), housemate on Big Brother 16

See also
 Joe Williams (disambiguation)